See the Glossary of underwater diving terminology for definitions of technical terms, jargon, diver slang and acronyms used in underwater diving
 See the Outline of underwater diving for a hierararchical listing of underwater diving related articles
 See the Index of underwater divers for an alphabetical listing of articles about underwater divers
 See the Index of recreational dive sites for an alphabetical listing of articles about places which are recreational dive sites

The following index is provided as an overview of and topical guide to underwater diving:

Underwater diving can be described as all of the following:
A human activity – intentional, purposive, conscious and subjectively meaningful sequence of actions. Underwater diving is practiced as part of an occupation, or for recreation, where the practitioner submerges below the surface of the water or other liquid for a period which may range between seconds to order of a day at a time, either exposed to the ambient pressure or isolated by a pressure resistant suit, to interact with the underwater environment for pleasure, competitive sport, or as a means to reach a work site for profit or in the pursuit of knowledge, and may use no equipment at all, or a wide range of equipment which may include breathing apparatus, environmental protective clothing, aids to vision, communication, propulsion, maneuverability, buoyancy and safety equipment, and tools for the task at hand.

1 – 9

A

B 
 
 
 
 
 
 
 
 Blood shift represented by Diving reflex#Blood shift –  redistributed blood flow from the extremities to the head and torso during a breath-hold dive.

 
 
 
 
 
 
 
 
 
 
 
 
 
 
 
 
 
 
 
 
 
 
 
 
 Byford Dolphin#Diving bell accident – Explosive decompression of saturation system on semi-submersible offshore drilling rig

C

D 
 
 
 
 
 
 
 
 
 
 
 
 
 
 
 
 
 
 
 
 
 
 
 
 
 
 
 
 
 

 
 
 
  (DPV)

E 
 
 
 SS Egypt#Salvage – Salvage of gold bullion from wreck using an armoured observation bell

F

G

H

I

J

K 
 
 
 Kursk submarine disaster#Salvage operation – Raising the wreck of a Russian nuclear submarine

L 
 
 
 LAR-5 represented by Drägerwerk – German manufacturer of breathing equipment
 LAR-6 represented by Drägerwerk – German manufacturer of breathing equipment
 LAR-V represented by Drägerwerk – German manufacturer of breathing equipment

M

N

O

P 
 
 
 
 
 
 
 
 
 
 
 
 
 Pillar valve represented by

R 
 
 
 
 
 
 
 
 
 
 
 
 
 
 
 
 
 
 
 
 
 
 
 
 
 
 
 
 
 
  – Early salvage operation using bells and surface supplied divers

S

T

U

V

W

Y

See also

References 

Underwater diving